Noviodunum, known also as Noviodunum ad Istrum, was a fort and a port in the Roman province of Moesia located on the lower Danube.

History

The geographical position of this settlement offered to the Romans the possibility of supervision and control of the border of the entire Roman limes in the north of the Danube. The strategic importance has been determinant in the economic and administrative function around which developed the military and naval legionaries.

Noviodunum was passed under Roman control with the annexation of Thrace in 46 AD, being then attached to the Roman province of Moesia.

It became an important port of Classis Flavia Moesica and a military center of the region starting from Domitian–Trajan, after the conquest of Dacia. Here some vexillationes of Legio V Macedonica were detached, at least until the reign of Marcus Aurelius. Then followed vexillationes of Legio I Italica,  and then from the Diocletian Legio I Iovia.

It was probably destroyed during the second half of the 3rd century during the period of heavy invasions of Goths and Heruli. It was rebuilt during the reign of Emperor Constantine the Great (after 324), during the military campaigns and placed under the command of Dux Scythiae. In 369, on the opposite bank of the Danube was fought a great battle between the Emperor Valens and Athanaric and its Tervingi.

Between 434 and 441 AD, the city with its naval base was occupied by the Huns and then went back under Roman rule and then be part of the Byzantine Empire.

Currently near its ruins is the Romanian town of Isaccea in Tulcea County, Northern Dobruja. The area has been subject to recent excavations, which have highlighted the importance.

See also
List of castra

Notes

References

 Barnea, Ion. Dinogetia et Noviodunum, deux villes byzantines du Bas-Danube RESEE, 9, 1971, 3, 343-362.
 Baumann, Victor Henrich. Atti del IV Convegno di Studi italo-romeno, Bari, 2004, 113-132
 Golvin, Jean Claude. I Romani e il Mediterraneo. Istituto Poligrafico e Zecca dello Stato. Roma, 2008. 
 Reddé, Michael. Mare nostrum - les infrastructures, le dispositif et l'histoire de la marine militaire sous l'empire romain. Ecole Française de Rome. Parigi, 1986. 
 Saddington, Denis B.. Classes. The Evolution of the Roman Imperial Fleets in Paul Erdkamp (a cura di), "A Companion to the Roman Army", Blackwell Publishing, 2007. 
 Starr, Chester G.. The Roman Imperial Navy: 31 B.C.-A.D. 324. 2nd. edition. Cornell University Press, 1960.

External links

Roman castra from Romania - Google Maps / Earth

Celtic towns
Roman vexillation forts in Romania
Roman harbors in Romania
Roman fortifications in Moesia Inferior
Historic monuments in Tulcea County